Phenolphthalein is a chemical compound with the formula C20H14O4 and is often written as "HIn", "HPh", "phph" or simply "Ph" in shorthand notation. Phenolphthalein is often used as an indicator in acid–base titrations. For this application, it turns colorless in acidic solutions and pink in basic solutions. It belongs to the class of dyes known as phthalein dyes.

Phenolphthalein is slightly soluble in water and usually is dissolved in alcohols for use in experiments. It is a weak acid, which can lose H+ ions in solution. The nonionized phenolphthalein molecule is colorless and the double deprotonated phenolphthalein ion is fuchsia.  Further loss of proton in higher pH occurs slowly and leads to a colorless form.  Phenolphthalein ion in concentrated sulfuric acid is orange red due to sulfonation.

Uses

pH indicator
Phenolphthalein's common use is as an indicator in acid-base titrations. It also serves as a component of universal indicator, together with methyl red, bromothymol blue, and thymol blue.

Phenolphthalein adopts different forms in aqueous solution depending on the pH of the solution.  Inconsistency exists in the literature with regard to the hydrated forms of the compounds and the color in sulfuric acid.  Wittke reported in 1983 that under strongly acidic conditions, it exists in protonated form (HIn+), providing an orange coloration. However, a later paper suggested that this color is due to sulfonation to phenolsulfonphthalein.

Between strongly acidic and slightly basic conditions, the lactone form (HIn) is colorless. The doubly deprotonated (In2-) phenolate form (the anion form of phenol) gives the familiar pink color. In strongly basic solutions, phenolphthalein is converted to its In(OH)3− form, and its pink color undergoes a rather slow fading reaction and becomes completely colorless when pH is greater than 13.

The pKA values of phenolphthalein was found to be 9.05, 9.50 and 12 while that of phenolsulfonphthalein are 1.2 and 7.70.

Carbonation of concrete
Phenolphthalein's pH sensitivity is exploited in other applications: concrete has naturally high pH due to the calcium hydroxide formed when Portland cement reacts with water. As the concrete reacts with carbon dioxide in the atmosphere, pH decreases to 8.5-9. When a 1% phenolphthalein solution is applied to normal concrete, it turns bright pink. However, if it remains colorless, it shows that the concrete has undergone carbonation. In a similar application, some spackling used to repair holes in drywall contains phenolphthalein. When applied, the basic spackling material retains a pink color; when the spackling has cured by reaction with atmospheric carbon dioxide, the pink color fades.

Education
In a highly basic solution, phenolphthalein's slow change from pink to colorless as it is converted to its Ph(OH)3− form is used in chemistry classes for the study of reaction kinetics.

Entertainment
Phenolphthalein is used in toys, for example as a component of disappearing inks, or disappearing dye on the "Hollywood Hair" Barbie hair. In the ink, it is mixed with sodium hydroxide, which reacts with carbon dioxide in the air. This reaction leads to the pH falling below the color change threshold as hydrogen ions are released by the reaction:
OH−(aq) + CO2(g) → (aq) + H+(aq).

To develop the hair and "magic" graphical patterns, the ink is sprayed with a solution of hydroxide, which leads to the appearance of the hidden graphics by the same mechanism described above for color change in alkaline solution. The pattern will eventually disappear again because of the reaction with carbon dioxide. Thymolphthalein is used for the same purpose and in the same way, when a blue color is desired.

Medical uses

Phenolphthalein has been used for over a century as a laxative, but is now being removed from over-the-counter laxatives because of risk of carcinogenicity. Laxative products formerly containing phenolphalein have often been reformulated to have alternate active ingredients: Feen-a-Mint switched to bisacodyl and Ex-Lax was switched to a senna extract.

Thymolphthalein is a related laxative made from thymol.

Despite concerns regarding its carcinogenicity, the use of phenolphthalein as a laxative is unlikely to cause ovarian cancer. Phenolphthalein has been found to inhibit human cellular calcium influx via store-operated calcium entry (SOCE, see ). This is effected by its inhibiting thrombin and thapsigargin, two activators of SOCE that increase intracellular free calcium.

Phenolphthalein has been added to the European Chemicals Agency's candidate list for Substances of Very High Concern (SVHC).

A reduced form of phenolphthalein, phenolphthalin, which is colorless, is used in a test to identify substances thought to contain blood, commonly known as the Kastle–Meyer test. A dry sample is collected with a swab or filter paper. A few drops of alcohol, then a few drops of phenolphthalin, and finally a few drops of hydrogen peroxide are dripped onto the sample. If the sample contains hemoglobin, it will turn pink immediately upon addition of the peroxide, because of the generation of phenolphthalein. A positive test indicates the sample contains hemoglobin and, therefore, is likely blood. A false positive can result from the presence of substances with catalytic activity similar to hemoglobin. This test is not destructive to the sample; it can be kept and used in further tests. This test has the same reaction with blood from any animal whose blood contains hemoglobin, including almost all vertebrates; further testing would be required to determine whether it originated from a human.

Synthesis
Phenolphthalein can be synthesized by condensation of phthalic anhydride with two equivalents of phenol under acidic conditions. It was discovered in 1871 by Adolf von Baeyer.

The reaction can also be catalyzed by a mixture of zinc chloride and thionyl chloride.

See also
Bromothymol blue
Litmus
Methyl orange
pH indicator
Universal indicator

References

External links

Page on different titration indicators, including phenolphthalein

PH indicators
Triarylmethane dyes
Phenols
IARC Group 2B carcinogens
Phthalides
Laxatives